The 1998–99 UEFA Champions League was the 44th season of the UEFA Champions League, Europe's premier club football tournament, and the seventh since it was renamed from the "European Champion Clubs' Cup" or "European Cup". The competition was won by Manchester United, coming back from a goal down in the last two minutes of injury time to defeat Bayern Munich 2–1 in the final. Teddy Sheringham and Ole Gunnar Solskjær scored United's goals after Bayern had hit the post and the bar. They were the first English club to win Europe's premier club football tournament since 1984 and were also the first English club to reach a Champions League final since the Heysel Stadium disaster and the subsequent banning of English clubs from all UEFA competitions between 1985 and 1990. It was the first time since 1968 that Manchester United won the Champions League, giving them their second title.

Manchester United also completed the Treble, becoming the fourth side in Europe to do so and in the process prevented Bayern Munich from achieving the feat themselves, Bayern eventually finished runners-up in their domestic cup two weeks later.

Manchester United won the trophy without losing a single match, despite having competed in a group with Bayern Munich, Barcelona and Brøndby, plus two highly rated Italian clubs in the knock-out stages. However, United became champions with just five wins in total, the lowest number of wins recorded by a champion in the Champions League era to date, though the competition now has an extra round of two matches in the knock-out stages.

It was the first time the Champions League was won by a team that had neither won their domestic league nor the Champions League the previous season and therefore would not have qualified for the tournament under the old qualification rules (title holder or national league champion). For the second time, the runners-up of eight domestic leagues entered the competition.

Real Madrid were the defending champions, but were eliminated in the quarter-finals by Dynamo Kyiv.

Association team allocation
Number of teams per country as well as the starting round for each club and seeding were based on 1998 UEFA league coefficient, which takes into account their performance in European competitions from 1993–94 to 1997–98.
Associations ranked 1–8 each have two participants
Associations ranked 9–48 each have one participant (except Liechtenstein)

Teams

Round and draw dates
The schedule of the competition is as follows (all draws are held in Geneva, Switzerland, unless stated otherwise).

Qualifying rounds

First qualifying round

|}

Second qualifying round
Losing teams qualified for the first round of the 1998–99 UEFA Cup.

|}

Note: Winning teams of the first qualifying round were drawn against teams qualified directly for the second qualifying round (16 and 16 teams).

This match was played at Naftex's Neftochimik Stadium in Burgas because Litex Lovech's Lovech Stadium in Lovech did not meet UEFA standards.
This match was played at FK Partizan's Partizan Stadium in Belgrade because FK Obilić's Miloš Obilić Stadium in Belgrade did not meet UEFA standards.

Group stage

Twenty-four teams took part in the group stage: the national champions of Italy, Germany, Spain, France, Netherlands, England and Portugal, the title holders, and the 16 winning teams from the second qualifying round. Arsenal, Athletic Bilbao, Brøndby, Croatia Zagreb, HJK, Internazionale, Kaiserslautern, Lens and Sturm Graz made their debuts in the group stage of the competition. This was the first time that a team from Finland played in the group stage.

The teams were divided into six groups of four teams each, with the teams in each group playing each other twice (home and away) in a double round-robin format. Three points were awarded for each win, with one point each for a draw and none for a defeat. The winners of each group progressed to the quarter-finals, along with the two best second-placed teams. In the event that two or more teams had the same number of points at the end of the group stage, the rankings of the teams in question were determined by the following criteria:
greater number of points obtained in the matches between the teams in question
goal difference resulting from the matches between the teams in question
greater number of goals scored away from home in matches between the teams in question
superior goal difference from all the matches played
greater number of goals scored
national association's coefficient at the start of the season in question

The two best runners-up were determined by the following criteria:
highest number of points obtained in the group matches
goal difference from all group matches
greater number of goals scored in all group matches
greater number of goals scored away from home
national association's coefficient at the start of the season in question
individual club coefficient at the start of the season in question

Group A

Group B

Group C

Group D

Group E

Group F

Ranking of second-placed teams

Knockout stage

The knockout stage was played in a single-elimination tournament format consisting of three rounds: quarter-finals, semi-finals and final. Each tie in the quarter-finals and semi-finals was played over two legs, with each team playing one leg at home, while the final was played as a single match at a neutral venue. In the quarter-finals and semi-finals, in the event that two teams scored the same number of goals over the two legs of their tie, the winner would be determined by the number of goals scored away from home. If both sides scored the same number of goals away from home, two 15-minute periods of extra time would be played. If both teams scored the same number of goals during extra time, the visiting team would qualify for the next round by virtue of having scored more goals away from home. If neither side scored during extra time, the match would be decided by a penalty shoot-out. In the final, if the scores were level after 90 minutes, two 15-minute periods of golden goal extra time would be played; i.e. whichever team scored first would be declared the winner. If neither side scored during golden goal extra time, a penalty shoot-out would again be used to determine the winner.

Bracket

Quarter-finals
In the quarter-finals, the two best runners-up could not be drawn together, nor could the winners and runners-up from the same group. Both runners-up played the first leg of their quarter-final at home, as did the teams drawn first in the other two quarter-finals.

|}

Semi-finals

|}

Final

Top goalscorers
The top scorers from the 1998–99 UEFA Champions League (excluding qualifying rounds) are as follows:

See also
1998–99 UEFA Cup
1998–99 UEFA Cup Winners' Cup
1998 UEFA Intertoto Cup

References

External links
 1998–99 All matches – season at UEFA website
 1998–99 season at UEFA website
 European Cup results at RSSSF
 All scorers 1998–98 UEFA Champions League (excluding qualifying round) according to protocols UEFA + all scorers qualifying round
 1998/99 UEFA Champions League – results and line-ups (archive)

 
UEFA Champions League seasons
1998–99 in European football